Rupa Ranga Puttagunta (born June 19, 1981) is an American lawyer who serves as an Associate Judge of the Superior Court of the District of Columbia. She was previously an administrative law judge in Washington, D.C.

Education 

Puttagunta received her Bachelor of Arts from Vassar College in 2002 and her Juris Doctor from the Ohio State University Moritz College of Law in 2007.

Legal and judicial career 

She began her legal career as a law clerk for Judge William M. Jackson of the D.C. Superior Court from 2008 to 2010, as well as the Senior Judges of the D.C. Court of Appeals from 2010 to 2011. She practiced family and appellate law at Delaney McKinney, LLP from 2012 to 2013. From 2013 to 2019, she was a solo practitioner. From 2019 to 2022, Puttagunta served as the Administrative Judge for the D.C. Rental Housing Commission.

D.C. Superior Court service 

On March 30, 2021, President Joe Biden announced his intent to nominate Puttagunta to serve as a Judge for the Superior Court of the District of Columbia. On April 19, 2021, her nomination was sent to the Senate. President Biden nominated Puttagunta to the seat vacated by Judge Patricia A. Broderick, whose term expired on June 5, 2020. On September 14, 2021, a hearing on her nomination was held before the Senate Homeland Security and Governmental Affairs Committee. On October 6, 2021, her nomination was reported out of committee by a voice vote. On February 1, 2022, the United States Senate invoked cloture on her nomination by a 59–38 vote. On February 2, 2022, she was confirmed by a 57–38 vote. She was sworn into office on February 25, 2022.

Personal life 

Puttagunta is of South Asian Indian descent.

References 

1981 births
Living people
21st-century American judges
21st-century American women lawyers
21st-century American lawyers
21st-century American women judges
American jurists of Asian descent
American jurists of Indian descent
Judges of the Superior Court of the District of Columbia
Lawyers from Washington, D.C.
Maryland lawyers
Ohio State University Moritz College of Law alumni
People from Lima, Ohio
Vassar College alumni